Reverend Father Paul Bovier-Lapierre (1873–1950) was a French Jesuit archaeologist, notable for his work on prehistory in Egypt and surveys in southern Lebanon.

References

External links
 Biography (in French) - Lebanese Museum of Prehistory, Saint Joseph University Website

19th-century French Jesuits
20th-century French Jesuits
French Roman Catholic missionaries
French archaeologists
1873 births
1950 deaths
Jesuit missionaries
Jesuit scientists
Roman Catholic missionaries in Egypt
Roman Catholic missionaries in Lebanon
French expatriates in Egypt
French expatriates in Lebanon